The Yakovlev AIR-1 (VVA-3) was a 1920s Soviet two-seat light biplane, the first aircraft designed and built by Aleksandr Sergeyevich Yakovlev.

Development
Yakovlev designed his first aircraft while working at the Zhukovsky Military Aviation Academy; the aircraft was a two-seat light biplane powered by a  ADC Cirrus piston engine. Although the directors of the Academy were opposed to the design, the aircraft was built in the Academy Club on his own time.  Originally designated VVA-3 (Military Aviation Academy-3) Yakovlev later redesignated it the AIR-1 in honour of Alexei Ivanovich Rykov, the country's premier (the Chairman of the Council of People's Commissars) and the president of the Osoviakihm. The first flight on 12 May 1927 was flown by Yakovlev's friend J.I. Piontkovsky, who later rated the flying qualities as excellent; Piontkovsky later flew the aircraft non-stop from Sevastopol to Moscow in 15½ hours, a distance of 1240 km. In 1928 Yakovlev produced an improved variant, the AIR-2; six were built between 1928 and 1931 fitted with different five-cylinder radial engines. One aircraft powered by a Siemens engine was designated AIR-2S and was fitted with floats designed by V B Shavrov.

Variants
AIR-1
Prototype with a  ADC Cirrus engine.
AIR-2
Improved variant fitted with either a Siemens, Walter NZ-60 or NAMI M-23 radial engine.
AIR-2S
AIR-2 fitted with two wooden floats.
VVA-3
Original designation of the AIR-1

Specifications (AIR-1)

References

Notes

Bibliography

External links

 Yakovlev AIR-1

1920s Soviet and Russian civil utility aircraft
1920s Soviet and Russian sport aircraft
AIR-1
Biplanes
Single-engined tractor aircraft
Aircraft first flown in 1927